Volkmannsdorf is a municipality in the Saale-Orla-Kreis district of Thuringia, Germany.

History 
Volkmannsdorf belonged until 1918 to the Duchy of Saxe-Weimar.

References

External links
 

Saale-Orla-Kreis